The Perth Scorchers is an Australian domestic Twenty20 franchise cricket team representing the Western Australian city of Perth in the Big Bash League (BBL).

The Scorchers are the current BBL Reinging Champions and are the most successful BBL team ever, having defeated the Brisbane Heat in the final of the 2022-23 season. They are also the most successful team in BBL history, winning a record five championships to date and being runners up on three occasions. They were defeated in their second final by the Brisbane Heat in BBL02. They then won the next two consecutive championships, becoming the first team to achieve the feat in the league's brief history. These wins came against the Hobart Hurricanes and the Sydney Sixers in a last-ball thriller at Canberra's Manuka Oval.They are currently searching a hatrick of season victories next season in bbl 13, after winning BBL 11 and BBL 12.

Mickey Arthur was originally appointed coach, but quit before the beginning of the 2011–12 season after he was appointed coach of the Australian cricket team. He was replaced by his former assistant, Lachlan Stevens.  Justin Langer replaced Stevens in November 2012. Following the appointment of Langer as the Australian coach in May 2018, Adam Voges was named as the new coach for the 2018–19 season.

Some of the Scorchers' finest players since their inception into the BBL have been Shaun Marsh, Michael Klinger, Cameron Bancroft, Mitch Marsh, Mitchell Johnson, Adam Voges, Ashton Turner, David Willey, Pakistani cricketers Yasir Arafat, Usman Qadir, Englishman Laurie Evans, legendary wrist spinner Brad Hogg and pace bowlers Jason Behrendorff, Jhye Richardson and Andrew Tye.

The Scorchers also have a side in the Women's Big Bash League.

Squad 
The current squad of the Perth Scorchers for the 2022–23 Big Bash League season as of 11 December 2022.

 Players with international caps are listed in bold.
  denotes a player who is currently unavailable for selection.
  denotes a player who is unavailable for rest of the season.

History

2011–2012: BBL01 season 

The majority of the initial Scorchers squad was recruited from the Western Australia cricket team, with the addition of West Australian Simon Katich and international imports South Africa's Herschelle Gibbs and England's Paul Collingwood.  Brad Hogg was recruited despite having not played state or international cricket since the 2007–08 season.

The Scorchers started the 2011–12 Big Bash League season poorly, losing to the Hobart Hurricanes in their opening game at the WACA Ground by 31 runs.  However, they subsequently won 5 games in a row, finishing the season at the top of the ladder and securing a home final. The Scorchers then won the semi-final against the Melbourne Stars by 11 runs but lost to the Sydney Sixers in the final by 7 wickets.

2012 Champions League
By finishing in the top two of the Big Bash League, they won a position at the 2012 Champions League Twenty20 tournament, held in South Africa in October 2012. The team performed poorly, only winning one game. The Marsh brothers, Shaun and Mitchell were both dropped from the final game after excessively celebrating Mitchell's 21st birthday during the tournament.

2012–2013: BBL02 season 

For the 2012–13 season, Collingwood did not return, and when their first choice overseas player Albie Morkel was unavailable, new coach Justin Langer recruited South African all-rounder Alfonso Thomas, who he had previously played with at Somerset. Other squad changes included the return of Adam Voges and the departure of Nathan Rimmington and Luke Ronchi. Tasmanian Tom Triffitt was recruited as the wicket keeper. Pat Cummins was recruited from the 2011–12 winning Sydney Sixers, but was injured whilst playing for the Sixers at the 2012 Champions League Twenty20 and did not play for the Scorchers.

The Scorchers again started the season poorly, losing to the Melbourne Stars in their second match when they scored an Australian record low team total of 69 runs.  However, as they did in the previous season, they recovered and won five of the next six games in a row, finishing in second position and securing a home final against the Melbourne Stars. In a rain-affected semi-final, the Scorchers won by 8 wickets off the final ball of the innings. They hosted the grand final against the Brisbane Heat but were defeated by 34 runs.

2013 Champions League
The Scorchers again qualified for the 2013 Champions League Twenty20 tournament, but with a squad depleted by injury and a lack of player availability, again performed poorly, losing all three of their matches to finish bottom of their group.

2013–2014: BBL03 season 

For their third BBL season, the Scorchers retained the services of senior players Simon Katich, Brad Hogg, Adam Voges, Shaun Marsh and Mitchell Marsh, but lost Michael Hussey and Marcus North to the two Sydney-based teams. South African Alfonso Thomas returned as an international player, but new signing Dwayne Smith from the West Indies did not travel to Perth due to personal reasons.  He was replaced in the team by Yasir Arafat from Pakistan.

The Scorchers finished third with five wins from eight games and defeated the Sydney Sixers in their semi-final at the Sydney Cricket Ground to advance final. The fourth-placed Hobart Hurricanes defeated the Melbourne Stars in the other semi-final, affording the Scorches the hosting rights for their third consecutive final. The Scorchers finally won their first BBL title, and brought silverware to Western Australian cricket for the first time in over a decade.

Final

2014–2015: BBL04 season 

Adam Voges was elected to captain the side after the retirement of Simon Katich, while Englishman Michael Carberry signed on for the season as an international recruit, and also regained the services of Yasir Arafat. For the fourth straight year, the Scorchers made it to the final of the Big Bash League, after finishing in 2nd place and defeating the Melbourne Stars in the semi-final for the third time. However, the final was not played the WACA Ground and was instead played at Manuka Oval due to World Cup and tri-series constraints, despite Perth technically earning a Home final after finishing ahead of their finals opponents the Sydney Sixers. The rematch of the BBL01 final came down to the last ball, with the Scorchers needing a run to win. After a brilliant last over from Brett Lee in his final cricket game which included 2 wickets, a fumbled run-out on the last ball handed the Scorchers their second title.

Final

2015–2016: BBL05 season 

Adam Voges retained his role as captain, while Michael Carberry and David Willey become the two international players. On 30 December 2015 the Scorchers completed the first ever 10-wicket win in BBL history against Melbourne Renegades. They maintained their record of qualifying for every Big Bash finals series, but lost to the Melbourne Stars in the semi-final, making this season the only one in which the Scorchers failed to qualify for the final, and ending their hopes of a third successive trophy.

2016–2017: BBL06 season 

Mitchell Johnson, having retired from international cricket, joined the Scorchers. Crowd favourite Brad Hogg left the Scorchers to join the Melbourne Renegades.  In the semi-final, Johnson took three wickets for three runs from his four overs, a BBL record low runs conceded, and the third best in all Twenty20 history. 
He was economical again in the final, conceding only 13 runs as Perth won their third BBL trophy, against the Sydney Sixers.

Final

2017–2018: BBL07 season 

The Scorchers unveiled an updated logo ready for the upcoming seventh Big Bash season. Unusually, they decided to only recruit a single overseas player, David Willey who would return for his third season. Mitchell Marsh took over the captaincy from Michael Klinger.

The Scorchers finished atop the table with eight wins in their ten matches and welcomed the Hobart Hurricanes to Perth Stadium for the semifinal. Winning the toss and electing to field first, a depleted Scorchers bowling unit had no answers for the bats of Matthew Wade and Ben McDermott, surrendering 210 runs in the innings. The bats never got going as the Scorchers could only answer with 139 runs before their tenth wicket fell in the 18th over.

2018–2019: BBL08 season 

Aside from Adam Voges moving from playing to coaching, the Scorchers returned most of their roster from BBL07, as well as adding Pakistani bowler Usman Qadir. However, very little would go right for them in this tournament. Struggles from key players like Klinger and Hilton Cartwright, as well as varying absences of Ashton Agar, Jason Behrendorff, and Jhye Richardson contributed to a poor season with only four wins in 14 matches. This would place the Scorchers last in the table, failing to qualify for the finals for the first time in BBL.

2019–2020: BBL09 season 

The Scorchers roster saw significant overhaul preceding BBL09, which included the retirement of Klinger as well as the departures of Cartwright, Nathan Coulter-Nile, and Shaun Marsh. Notable additions included bowlers Fawad Ahmed and Matthew Kelly, batsmen Nick Hobson and Kurtis Patterson, and English imports Chris Jordan and Liam Livingstone. Ahmed and Jordan proved effective additions with 15 wickets each, and Livingstone made for a dynamic opening partnership with Josh Inglis. Depth was an issue, however, and the Scorchers would finish with six wins in 14 matches, just one point behind the Hurricanes and Thunder for a spot in the now expanded BBL playoff.

2020–2021: BBL10 season 

The Scorchers loaded up on import bats for BBL10, returning Livingstone as well as bringing on Joe Clarke, Colin Munro, and Jason Roy. Ashton Turner took over the captaincy for this tournament. The Scorchers stumbled out of the gates, with three defeats and a no result in their first four matches. They ended the skid with a New Year's Eve victory over the Adelaide Strikers and would go on to win eight of the last ten matches and finish second on the table behind the Sydney Sixers. Munro had a strong tournament that earned him a spot on the ESPNcricinfo BBL team of the season. He was joined by Jhye Richardson, who led the tournament with 29 wickets. The Scorchers fell to the Sixers in the Qualifier before cruising to a 49 run victory over the Brisbane Heat in the Challenger. This earned them a rematch against the Sixers in the Final. Scorchers bowling was unable to contain the opposition's bats as the Sixers won by 27 runs to claim consecutive BBL titles.

Final

2021–2022: BBL11 season 

The Scorchers retained most of their key players going into BBL11. Whilst they lost imports Livingstone, Clarke, and Roy, they brought in English batter Laurie Evans and fast bowler Tymal Mills. However, the Scorchers would face a unique challenge in this tournament. After an opening victory over Brisbane Heat in Perth, the Scorchers were forced to play all of their remaining games on the road due to Western Australia's tightened travel requirements in response to the ongoing COVID-19 pandemic. Undeterred, the squad started the tournament on a blistering pace with wins in their first six matches. The Scorchers would go on to finish atop the table with 11 wins in 14 matches. Marsh, Agar, and Tye all had stellar tournaments and were named to the ESPNcricinfo BBL team of the season. In the Qualifier, the Scorchers cruised to a handy 48 run victory over the Sixers. In the Final six days later, the Scorchers again faced a Sixers squad depleted by injury and COVID-19. With outstanding bowling and an audacious partnership between Evans and Turner, the Scorchers defeated the Sixers by 79 runs to win their record fourth BBL title.

Final

2022–2023: BBL12 season 

Due to a number of factors, the Scorchers lost numerous key pieces from BBL11's championship squad. Opener Patterson signed with the Sixers, while Munro was taken by the Heat in the inaugural BBL international draft. The Scorchers made three picks in the draft and none would play in the tournament. Evans, the 12th overall pick, had his contract terminated on 11 November after testing positive for a banned substance. Phil Salt, the 19th overall pick, withdrew from the tournament due to injury on 2 December, while Marsh was ruled out of the tournament on the same day. Mills, the 30th and final pick of the draft, withdrew on 15 December for personal reasons that were later revealed to be a stroke suffered by his daughter. To cover for these losses, the Scorchers signed South African batter Faf du Plessis as well as English batters Adam Lyth and Stephen Eskinazi. Despite the personnel losses, the Scorchers started the tournament strong. The Scorchers finished the season on top of the season ladder playing the Sydney Sixers in Perth in the Qualifier match and beating them by 7 wickets on the back of a 132* run partnership between captain Ashton Turner and opener Cam Bancroft to reach the BBL final for the eighth time.

They played the Brisbane Heat a week later in the BBL12 Decider, winning by 5 wickets with 4 balls remaining. On a very hot day at Perth Stadium in front of a record Scorchers and BBL Finals crowd of 53,886, Brisbane set a competitive target of 175. In the run chase, every Scorchers' batsman reached double figures, but only Turner scored a half century, with 53 runs from 32 balls until he was run out. It was then left to the inexperienced Nick Hobson and teenager Cooper Connolly to score the remaining 39 runs from the last 19 balls. Connolly, in only his second BBL innings, scored 25 runs off 11 balls including 2 sixes before Hobson finished the task with a six and a four to give the Scorchers their fifth Big Bash title.

Final

Honours

Domestic
Big Bash:
Champions (5): 2013–14, 2014–15, 2016–17, 2021–22, 2022–23
Runners-up (3): 2011–12, 2012–13, 2020–21
Minor Premiers (5): 2011–12, 2016–17, 2017–18, 2021–22, 2022–23
Finals Series Appearances (10):  2011–12, 2012–13, 2013–14, 2014–15, 2015–16, 2016–17, 2017–18, 2020–21, 2021–22, 2022–23
Wooden Spoons (1): 2018–19

International
Champions League Twenty20:
Appearances (3): 2012, 2013, 2014
Note: The Scorchers qualified for the 2015 tournament, but the tournament was cancelled before it started.

Captains

Records and statistics

International players
Paul Collingwood  (BBL01 & 2012 CL)
Herschelle Gibbs  (BBL01, 2012 CL & BBL02)
Alfonso Thomas  (BBL02 & BBL03)
Yasir Arafat   (BBL03, 2014 CL & BBL04)
Michael Carberry  (BBL04 & BBL05)
David Willey  (BBL05 – BBL08)
Ian Bell  (BBL06)
Tim Bresnan  (BBL06 & BBL07, replacement for Willey)
Usman Qadir  (BBL08)
Liam Livingstone  (BBL09, BBL10, late games)
Chris Jordan  (BBL09)
Morné Morkel  (BBL09, replacement for Jordan)
Colin Munro  (BBL10 & BBL11)
Jason Roy  (BBL10, late games)
Joe Clarke  (BBL10, early games)
Laurie Evans  (BBL11)
Tymal Mills  (BBL11)
Faf du Plessis  (BBL12, early games, replacement for Evans)
Adam Lyth  (BBL12, early games, replacement for Salt)
Stephen Eskinazi  (BBL12, replacement for du Plessis)
David Payne (BBL12, replacement for Mills)

Albie Morkel from South Africa was signed for the 2012–13 season, but was not issued a clearance to play by the South African Cricket Board. The next year, Dwayne Smith from the West Indies was signed, but did not arrive.  Alfonso Thomas and Yasir Arafat were signed as the respective replacement players.

For BBL12, all three of the Scorchers' draft selections, Laurie Evans, Phil Salt and Tymal Mills, had to withdraw due to a positive drug test, injury and a family emergency respectively.

Timeline

References

External links

 

Big Bash League teams
Cricket teams in Western Australia
Cricket clubs established in 2011
Sporting clubs in Perth, Western Australia